The Cathedral of Saint Mary of Tudela (Spanish: Catedral de Santa Maria) is a Roman Catholic cathedral located in Plaza Vieja in the center of Tudela, autonomous community of Navarre, Spain. The medieval building was originally a collegiate church. It became a cathedral with the creation of the Diocese of Tudela, which existed 1783-1851 and again 1889-1956. It is now a co-cathedral in the Archdiocese of Pamplona and Tudela.

History
Christians under Alfonso the Battler conquered Tudela in 1119. The city had been under Muslim control, although three religious communities were living there. In the aftermath of the conquest, Muslims were forced to live in a suburb outside the city walls. The city´s main mosque was handed over to the church. The site was designated for the construction of a church (prior to the mosque there had been a church there dedicated to Santa María la Blanca). Construction began on a collegiate church in 1168.

The architectural style initially used was Romanesque.
Among the treasures of the church, are the three Romanesque portals with elaborate sculptural decoration.
Unusually, it devotes most of its decorated space to depictions of the torments of Hell.

The nave and chapels was rebuilt in Gothic-style. Construction lasted until the 13th-century.

The sculpture of the Assumption of the Virgin (1606) is by Juan Bascardo.

The central choir was completed by Esteban de Obray in Gothic style. The organ was made in 1759 by Lucas de Tarazona of Lerín.

Conservation and access
In 1884, the collegiate church (the building was not at the time a cathedral) was declared a national monument.

Guided visits for tourists are organised at times when services are not taking place.

See also
Catholic Church in Spain

References

External links

Tudela Museum. It includes the cloister and guided visits to the cathedral.
Tudela in the CENOBIUM project for the documentation of Romanesque cloisters.
Puerta del Juicio .

Bien de Interés Cultural landmarks in Navarre
Churches in Navarre
Former collegiate churches in Spain
Former mosques in Spain
Conversion of non-Christian religious buildings and structures into churches
Roman Catholic cathedrals in Navarre
12th-century Roman Catholic church buildings in Spain
Romanesque architecture in Navarre
Gothic architecture in Navarre